Lafut-e Pain (also romanized as Lafūt-e Pā’īn) is a village in Kurka Rural District, in the Central District of Astaneh-ye Ashrafiyeh County, Gilan Province, Iran. At the 2006 census, its population was 304, in 90 families.

References 

Populated places in Astaneh-ye Ashrafiyeh County